San Joaquín is a commune of Chile.

San Joaquín may also refer to:

 San Joaquín, Belize
 San Joaquín Municipality, Beni, Bolivia
 San Joaquín Municipality, Querétaro, Mexico
 San Joaquín Municipality, Carabobo, Venezuela
 San Joaquín de Flores, Costa Rica
 San Joaquín, Ecuador, Ecuador

See also
San Joaquin (disambiguation)